The Man Who Mistook His Wife for a Hat and Other Clinical Tales is a 1985 book by neurologist Oliver Sacks describing the case histories of some of his patients. Sacks chose the title of the book from the case study of one of his patients  who  has visual agnosia, a neurological condition that leaves him unable to recognize faces and objects. The book became the basis of an opera of the same name by Michael Nyman, which premiered in 1986.

The book comprises twenty-four essays split into four sections ("Losses", "Excesses", "Transports", and "The World of the Simple"), each dealing with a particular aspect of brain function. The first two sections discuss deficits and excesses (with particular emphasis on the right hemisphere of the brain), while the third and fourth sections describe phenomenological manifestations with reference to spontaneous reminiscences, altered perceptions, and extraordinary qualities of mind found in people with intellectual disabilities.

In addition to describing the cases, Sacks comments on them, explains their pathophysiological background, discusses potential neuroscientific implications of such cases and occasionally makes reference to some psychological concepts, such as the soul, id, ego, and super-ego.

Content 
The individual essays in this book include:
 "The Man Who Mistook His Wife for a Hat", about Dr. P., a singer and music teacher who has visual agnosia. He perceives separate features of objects, but cannot correctly identify them or the whole objects that they are part of. At first he supposes that diabetes has affected his vision, but an ophthalmologist suspects a neurological problem and refers him to Sacks. As he leaves Sacks' examination room during his first visit, he momentarily grabs his wife's head, supposing it to be his hat. Unable to treat Dr. P.'s problem, Sacks encourages him to focus on his musical interests, which remain intact.
 "The Lost Mariner", about Jimmie G., who has anterograde amnesia (the loss of the ability to form new memories) due to Korsakoff syndrome acquired after a rather heavy episode of alcoholism in 1970. He can remember nothing of his life since the end of World War II, including events that happened only a few minutes ago. Occasionally, he can recall a few fragments of his life between 1945 and 1970, such as when he sees "satellite" in a headline and subsequently remarks about a satellite tracking job he had that could only have occurred in the 1960s. He believes it is still 1945 (the segment covers his life in the 1970s and early 1980s), and seems to behave as a normal, intelligent young man aside from his inability to remember most of his past and the events of his day-to-day life. He struggles to find meaning, satisfaction, and happiness in the midst of constantly forgetting what he is doing from one moment to the next.
 "The President's Speech", about a ward of aphasiacs and agnosiacs listening to a speech given by an unnamed actor-president, "the old charmer", presumably Ronald Reagan.  Many of them laughed at the speech, while others were shocked. Sacks observes that while aphasiacs struggle with words, they can understand natural speech, because the words are paired with other expressive cues. They are acutely aware when the words and cues do not match. The agnosiacs perceived the president's words without understanding them, and found them illogically structured, with one remarking that "he does not speak good prose."
 "The Disembodied Lady", a unique case of a woman losing her entire sense of proprioception (the sense of the position of parts of the body, relative to other neighboring parts of the body), due to acute polyneuropathy. Over the course of months, she learns to control her body by visual feedback alone.
 "The Man Who Fell out of Bed", is about a young man whom Dr. Sacks sees as a medical student. Sacks encounters the patient on the floor of his hospital room, where he tells Sacks that he woke up to find a strange leg in his bed. Assuming that one of the nurses had played a prank on him, he attempted to toss the leg out of bed, only to find that he was attached to it. Although Sacks attempts to persuade the patient that the leg is his own, he remains bewildered in an apparent case of somatoparaphrenia.
 "On the Level", another case involving damaged proprioception. Dr. Sacks interviews a patient who has trouble walking upright and discovers that he has lost his innate sense of balance due to Parkinson's-like symptoms that have damaged his inner ears; the patient, comparing his sense of balance to a carpenter's spirit level, suggested constructing a similar level inside a pair of glasses. This enables him to judge his balance by sight and after a few weeks, the task of keeping his eye on the level became less tiring.
 "The Twins", about autistic savants. Dr. Sacks meets twin brothers who can neither read nor perform multiplication, yet are playing a "game" of finding very large prime numbers. While the twins were able to spontaneously generate these numbers, from six to twenty digits, Sacks had to resort to a book of prime numbers to join in with them. The twins also instantly count 111 dropped matches, simultaneously remarking that 111 is three 37s. This story has been questioned by Makoto Yamaguchi, who doubts that a book of large prime numbers could exist as described, and points out that reliable scientific reports only support approximate perception when rapidly counting large numbers of items. Autistic savant Daniel Tammet points out that the twins provided the matchbox and may have counted its contents beforehand, noting that he finds the value of 111 to be "particularly beautiful and matchstick-like".
 "Eyes Right", about a woman in her sixties who has hemispatial neglect. She completely forgets the idea of "left" relative to her own body and the world around her. When nurses place food or drink on her left side, she fails to recognize that they are there. Dr. Sacks attempts to show the patient the left side of her body using a video screen setup; when the patient sees the left side of her body, on her right, she is overwhelmed with anxiety and asks for it to stop.
 "The Dog Beneath the Skin", concerning a 22-year-old medical student, "Stephen D.", who, after a night under the influence of amphetamines, cocaine, and PCP, wakes to find he has a tremendously heightened sense of smell. Sacks would reveal many years later that he, in fact, was Stephen D.
 "The Autist Artist", about a 21-year-old named Jose who had been deemed "hopelessly retarded" and had seizures; however, when given Sacks' pocket watch and asked to draw it, he composed himself and drew the watch in surprising detail.

In popular culture
Christopher Rawlence wrote the libretto for a chamber opera—directed by Michael Morris with music by Michael Nyman—based on the title story. The Man Who Mistook His Wife for a Hat was first produced by the Institute of Contemporary Arts in London in 1986. A television version of the opera was subsequently broadcast in the UK.

Peter Brook adapted Sacks's book into an acclaimed theatrical production, L'Homme Qui..., which premiered at the Théâtre des Bouffes du Nord, Paris, in 1993. An Indian theatre company performed a play entitled The Blue Mug, based on the book, starring Rajat Kapoor, Konkona Sen Sharma, Ranvir Shorey, and Vinay Pathak.

The Man Who, an album by the Scottish indie pop band Travis, is named after this book.

See also
 An Anthropologist on Mars, 1995 Sacks book
 Proprioception
 Aphasia
 Blindsight
 Hemispatial neglect
 V. S. Ramachandran
 Daniel Levitin
 Steven Pinker

References

Notes

Bibliography

 
 , 158 pp.

External links

 .
 .

1985 non-fiction books
Books by Oliver Sacks
Simon & Schuster books
Gerald Duckworth and Company books